The Maryland Department of Labor (called the Department of Labor, Licensing, and Regulation until 2019) is a government agency in the U.S. state of Maryland. It is headquartered at 1100 North Eutaw Street in Baltimore.

History 
Today's Department of Labor can trace its history to the labor rights movements of the late 19th century. In 1884, the Maryland state government created the Bureau of Statistics and Information to collect information on labor problems and abuses, which were reported annually to the General Assembly. 

In 1902, the Assembly directed the Bureau to begin operating a free employment agency. In 1916, the Bureau was renamed the State Board of Labor and Statistics and given new duties: mediating labor disputes and enforcing laws governing hours of work and the employment of women and minors. Renamed the Department of Labor and Industry in 1945, it continued to gather statistics and run the employment agency, but its focus gradually shifted towards regulating labor conditions, including issuing work certificates to minors. 

In 1970, a general reorganization of the state government's executive branch pulled labor-related functions—including the agency that had overseen Maryland's unemployment compensation since 1936—into a new Department of Employment and Social Services. In 1983, labor functions were hived off into a new Department of Employment and Training—which just four years later was downgraded to a division and swept into the Department of Economic and Employment Development.

The 1970 reorganization also produced the Department of Licensing and Regulation, the result of consolidating more than 30 state agencies and boards that licensed or regulated various businesses, professions, and trades. In 1995, DLR absorbed the Division of Employment and Training and was renamed the Department of Labor, Licensing, and Regulation.

In 2019, it was renamed the Department of Labor.

Secretaries 
Secretaries of the department, which has been known as Licensing and Regulation (L&R); Labor, Licensing, and Regulation (LLR), and Labor, include:
 Frederick L. Dewberry, Secretary of L&R, 1984–86
 William A. Fogle, Jr., Secretary of L&R, 1987–94
 Frank W. Stegman, Secretary of L&R, 1995
 Eugene A. Conti, Jr., Secretary of LLR, 1995–98
 John P. O'Connor, Secretary of LLR, 1999–2003
 James D. Fielder, Jr., Secretary of LLR, 2003–07
 Thomas E. Perez, Secretary of LLR, 2007–2009
 Alexander M. Sanchez, Secretary of LLR, 2009–12
 Scott R. Jensen, Interim Secretary of LLR, 2012
 Leonard J. Howie III, Secretary of LLR, 2012–2015
 Kelly M. Schulz, Secretary of LLR, 2015–2019
 James Rzepkowski, Assistant Secretary of LLR, 2015–2019; Acting Secretary of LLR, Jan. 2019–June 2019; Acting Secretary of Labor, July 2019; Assistant Secretary of Labor, Aug. 2019–present.
 Tiffany P. Robinson, Secretary of Labor, 2019–2023.
 Portia Wu, Acting Secretary of Labor, 2023–present

Organization 
The Maryland Department of Labor includes the following divisions:

Offices of the Secretary and the Deputy Secretary 
 Board of Appeals (2nd. level of appeal of unemployment insurance cases)
 Lower Appeals Division (first level of appeal in unemployment insurance cases)
 Administration
 Communications and Media Relations
 Counsel
 Fair Practices
 General Services
 Information Technology
 Legislative and Regulatory Affairs
 Policy Development
 Program Analysis & Audit
 Small Business Regulatory Assistance

Division of Labor and Industry 

 Employment Standards, Wage & Hour
 Maryland Occupational Safety and Health (MOSH)
 Prevailing Wage, Living Wage, Worker Classification Protection
 Safety Inspection
 Amusement ride inspection
 Boiler and pressure vessel safety inspection
 Elevator safety inspection
 Railroad safety and health
 Building Codes Administration

Office of Financial Regulation 
 Administration
 Bank Supervision
 Bank Corporate Activities
 Enforcement and Complaints
 Licensing – Nondepository Institutions
 Mortgage Compliance – Nondepository Institutions
 Policy – Nondepository Institutions

Division of Occupational and Professional Licensing 
 State Board of Architects
 State Athletic Commission
 State Board of Barbers
 Office of Cemetery Oversight
 State Board of Cosmetologists
 State Board of Master Electricians
 State Board for Professional Engineers
 State Board of Stationary Engineers
 State Board of Foresters
 State Board of Heating, Ventilation, Air-Conditioning, and Refrigeration Contractors
 Maryland Home Improvement Commission
 State Board of Certified Interior Designers
 State Board for Professional Land Surveyors
 State Board of Examiners of Landscape Architects
 State Board of Pilots
 State Board of Plumbing
 State Board of Public Accountancy
 State Real Estate Commission
 State Commission of Real Estate Appraisers and Home Inspectors
 State Board of Individual Tax Preparers
 Licensure of secondhand precious metal object dealers and pawnbrokers
 Licensure of sports agents

Division of Racing 
 Maryland Racing Commission

Division of Unemployment Insurance 
The Division of Unemployment Insurance makes the initial decision on unemployment benefit claims. Appeals are handled in the Lower Appeals Division and the Board of Appeals, under the Office of the Deputy Secretary.
 Benefits and Special Programs Section
 Contributions
 Policy and Planning Unit

Division of Workforce Development & Adult Learning 
 Workforce Development oversees the State’s workforce programs. Working with Local Workforce Investment Areas, services include matching job seekers and employers, providing training, and reporting on the needs and demands of the labor market.
 Adult Education and Literacy Services, which also includes Correctional Education, offers adult instructional services and GED testing for people who are at least 16 years old and not enrolled in school. Programs are offered in all Maryland jurisdictions and provide classes for English-language learners and adults who want to improve their reading, writing, and math skills, or who want to earn a high school diploma through the GED tests or the Maryland National External Diploma Program (NEDP). 
 The Adult Education, Adult Correctional Education, and GED programs were moved from the Maryland State Department of Education (MSDE).

References

Notes

External links 
 
Biographies of former Secretaries

 
State departments of labor of the United States
Bank regulation in the United States by state